This is a list of professional wrestling promotions in South America, sorted by country, and lists both active and defunct professional wrestling promotions.

South America

Argentina

Bolivia

Brazil

Chile

Colombia

Ecuador

Peru

Venezuela

See also

List of women's wrestling promotions
List of professional wrestling promotions in Europe

References

External links
 List Of All Promotions at Cagematch.net
 List Of All Promotions at wrestlingdata.com
 Promotions on onlineworldofwrestling.com

Professional wrestling promotions
Promotions in South America
South America sport-related lists